Grider may refer to:

People
Dallas Grider, American football player and coach
Dorothy Grider (1915–2012), American illustrator of children's books
George W. Grider (1912–1991), United States Navy submarine captain of World War II and United States Congressman for Tennessee
Henry Grider (1796–1866), U.S. Representative from Kentucky
J. Kenneth Grider (1921–2006), Christian theologian
John McGavock Grider (1893-1918), World War I fighter pilot
Leroy Milton Grider (1854–1919), American real estate developer and politician
Nat Grider (born 2000), Australian rules footballer
Sylvia Grider (born 1940), American folklorist

Places in the United States 
Grider, Arkansas, an unincorporated community on Arkansas Highway 198 in Mississippi County, Arkansas
Grider, Kentucky, an unincorporated community in Cumberland County, Kentucky
Grider Field, an airport in Pine Bluff, Arkansas

See also 

 Griderville, Kentucky